"Move Your Body" is a song by Italian musical group Eiffel 65. It was released as the third single from their debut album, Europop, on 30 November 1999.

Composition

"Move Your Body" is a bubblegum techno and disco song played in D minor at 130 BPM. It has dance-oriented sounds and uses the same pitch shifter–based distortion as the vocals from the previous single, "Blue (Da Ba Dee)". Group member Jeffrey Jey claimed that the song "had tried to recall the original spirit of the dance, understood as a vehicle to bring together and communicate with people."

Critical reception
Entertainment Weekly said in a review of Europop that it was hard to call "Move Your Body" a "timeless masterpiece," but it was impossible to hate it. The song was included on SputnikMusic's review of the album as an example of Eiffel 65's poor ability at writing lyrics. Billboard called it a "kitschy electronic number" and commented on "the song's catchy melody, addictive lyrical redundancy, and the familiar computerized voice of the trio's Jeffrey Jey".

Commercial performance
While the single was issued through WEA Records in Italy, it was licensed to several labels for international release. In the UK, it was licensed to Warner Music Group's Eternal label, in the US to Universal Music Group's Republic, in Germany to BMG Berlin, in France to Scorpio, in Spain to Blanco y Negro, in Australia to Central Station, and to Valentine and Avex in Southeast Asia.

The song achieved huge success in many countries, topping the charts of Austria, Denmark, France, Italy and Spain; however it charted at only number 36 on the US Billboard Top 40 Mainstream.

Elia Habib, an expert of the French charts, noted the great efficiency of the song on the SNEP chart, since it was strong enough to dislodge the massive hit "Mambo No. 5 (A Little Bit Of...)" and to resist to its competitors, which prevented Eiffel 65 to remain a one-hit wonder, and enabled the band to become the first one to get its second number one single in France.

Music video

The music video is sort of a sequel to the music video for “Blue (Da Ba Dee)”, as it features the same blue aliens (their leader being named Zorotl). The band has a concert on the planet of the blue aliens, when a group of hostiles capture a female alien. The band (with the help of Zorotl) use a teleportation device to search for her. When they find her, the hostiles join the concert.

Track listings

CD maxi 1 - Germany
 "Move Your Body" (D.J. Gabry Ponte original radio edit) — 4:30
 "Move Your Body" (D.J. Gabry Ponte original club mix) — 5:54
 "Move Your Body" (D.J. Gregory Kolla & Alex X Funk Claywork mix) — 6:20
 "Move Your Body" (D.J. Gabry Ponte speed cut) — 5:32

CD maxi 2 - Germany
 "Move Your Body" (D.J. Gabry Ponte original video edit) — 3:30
 "Move Your Body" (D.J. Gabry Ponte speed radio cut) — 3:31
 "Move Your Body" (D.J. Gabry Ponte original club mix) — 5:54
 "Move Your Body" (Roby Molinaro forge edit) — 7:03
 "Blue (Da Ba Dee)" (Molinaro parade German cut) — 2:47

CD maxi - UK
 "Move Your Body" (D.J. Gabry Ponte edit) — 3:29
 "Move Your Body" (D.J. Gabry Ponte original club mix) — 5:55
 "Move Your Body" (album sampler megamix) — 6:07

CD single
 "Move Your Body" (D.J. Gabry Ponte original video edit) — 3:30
 "Move Your Body" (D.J. Gabry Ponte original club mix) — 5:54

12-inch maxi - Spain
 "Move Your Body" (D.J. Gabry Ponte original club mix) — 5:45
 "Move Your Body" (D.J. Gabry Ponte speed cut) — 5:31
 "Move Your Body" (Roby Molinaro forge edit) — 7:03

12-inch maxi - UK
 "Move Your Body" (D.J. Gabry Ponte original club mix) — 5:55
 "Move Your Body" (D.J. Gregory Kolla & Alex X Funk Claywork mix) — 6:25
 "Move Your Body" (Roby Molinaro forge edit) — 7:03
 "Move Your Body" (casino machine Paris dub) — 7:01

Charts and sales

Weekly charts

Year-end charts

Certifications

Release history

See also
 List of number-one hits of 2000 (Austria)
 List of number-one hits of 2000 (France)
 List of number-one hits of 2000 (Italy)
 List of European number-one hits of 2000

References

External links
 Album information

1999 singles
1999 songs
Animated music videos
Eiffel 65 songs
European Hot 100 Singles number-one singles
Logic Records singles
Number-one singles in Austria
Number-one singles in Denmark
Number-one singles in Italy
Republic Records singles
SNEP Top Singles number-one singles
Songs about dancing
Songs written by Maurizio Lobina
Warner Music Group singles